La ilustre fregona (The Illustrious Kitchen Maid or The Illustrious Scullery-maid) is a novella by Miguel de Cervantes, published in the collection Novelas ejemplares. It tells the story of two wealthy young men who fall in love with a kitchen maid in Toledo. The story contains mistaken identities, ironic comments and genre traits of the picaresque novel and pastoral romance.

It was the basis for the 1928 Spanish film La ilustre fregona, directed by Armando Pou.

References

1613 short stories
Spanish novels adapted into films
Short stories by Miguel de Cervantes